South Sudan is populated by about 64 ethnic groups. The Dinka are the largest ethnic group recorded, followed by the Nuer as the second largest tribe in South Sudan, the Shilluk follows as the third in number. it's disputed that Bari is 4th according to their territory which is Juba county. Zande, also known as Azande, are the fifth largest tribe in South Sudan with a total population of 100,000 followed by Balanda with a population of 80,000.

While composed of many ethnic groups, the Fertit in Lol State have formed a unique identity.

References

South Sudan
Ethnic groups in South Sudan